The 2003 Spengler Cup was held in Davos, Switzerland from December 26 to December 31, 2003.  All matches were played at host HC Davos's home Eisstadion Davos. The final was won 7-4 by Team Canada over host HC Davos.

Teams participating
 Team Canada
 HC Davos (host)
 Krefeld Pinguine
 Jokerit
 Lokomotiv Yaroslavl

Tournament

Round-Robin results

All times local (CET/UTC +1)

Finals

External links
Spenglercup.ch

2003–04
2003–04 in Swiss ice hockey
2003–04 in Russian ice hockey
2003–04 in Canadian ice hockey
2003–04 in Finnish ice hockey
2003–04 in German ice hockey
December 2003 sports events in Europe